Jacques Rashaud McClendon (born December 10, 1987) is a former American football center. He was drafted by the Indianapolis Colts in the fourth round of the 2010 NFL Draft. He played college football at Tennessee. He currently serves as the Director of Football Affairs for the Los Angeles Rams. He also serves on the Knight Commission for Intercollegiate Athletics.

High school career
McClendon played in the U.S. Army All-American Bowl, which features the top high school football players in the country. He also was named the Gatorade Player of the Year for the state of Tennessee. It is an award given to the most outstanding high school talents in each state for their athletic achievement, academic excellence and exemplary character.

College career
McClendon appeared in 49 games for Tennessee, including 26 starts. He was a three time Academic All-SEC selection and holds a master's degree in Sports Management.

Professional career

Indianapolis Colts 
On April 24, 2010, McClendon was drafted by the Indianapolis Colts in the fourth round (129 overall) in the 2010 NFL Draft. On September 4, 2011, he was waived.

Detroit Lions 
On September 4, 2011, he was claimed off waivers by the Detroit Lions. His contract expired following the 2011 season, making him a free agent.

Pittsburgh Steelers 
McClendon signed with the Pittsburgh Steelers during the 2012 season.

Atlanta Falcons 
On January 21, 2013, he signed a 2-year, $1.2 million contract with the Atlanta Falcons. On September 1 he was waived.

Jacksonville Jaguars 
He was claimed off waivers by the Jacksonville Jaguars on September 1, 2013. He started the final two games of the 2013 season for the Jaguars following injuries to Mike Brewster and Will Rackley. He became a free agent after the 2014 season.

Miami Dolphins 
On April 22, 2015, McClendon was signed by the Miami Dolphins. On September 11, 2015, he was released by the Dolphins. On September 14, 2015, he was re-signed by the Dolphins. On September 26, 2015, he was waived by the Dolphins. On December 1, 2015, McClendon was signed by the Dolphins. On December 15 he was once again waived. On December 22, 2015, McClendon was re-signed by the Dolphins.

On March 11, 2016, the Dolphins re-signed McClendon to a 1-year, $840,000 contract.

Jacksonville Jaguars (second stint)
On August 17, 2016, McClendon was signed by the Jaguars. On September 3, 2016, he was released by the Jaguars.

References

External links
Detroit Lions bio 
Tennessee Volunteers bio

1987 births
Living people
People from Cleveland, Tennessee
Players of American football from Tennessee
African-American players of American football
American football offensive guards
American football centers
American football tight ends
Tennessee Volunteers football players
Indianapolis Colts players
Detroit Lions players
Pittsburgh Steelers players
Atlanta Falcons players
Jacksonville Jaguars players
Miami Dolphins players
21st-century African-American sportspeople
20th-century African-American people